The Parliament of Gabon consists of two chambers:

The Senate (Upper Chamber)
The National Assembly (Lower Chamber)

See also
 Politics of Gabon
 List of legislatures by country
 Legislative branch

References

External links
 National Assembly

Politics of Gabon
Political organizations based in Gabon
Gabon
Gabon
Gabon